Chak Mander is a village in Shaheed Bhagat Singh Nagar district of Punjab State, India. The village is administrated by Sarpanch, an elected representative of the village.

Demography 
In 2011, Chak Mander has 176 houses and a population of 859 (428 include and 431 females) according to the report published by the 2011 Census of India. The literacy rate was 82.79%, higher than the state average of 75.84%. There were 86 children under the age of 6 years (10.01% of the population) and the child sex ratio was approximately 921, compared to the Punjab state average of 846.

Most of the people weare from schedule castes which constitute 68.80% of the population. The village did not have any schedule tribe population.

According to Census India in 2011, 265 people were engaged in work activities (239 males and 26 females). 95.85% of workers described their work as main work and 4.15% workers were involved in marginal activity providing livelihood for less than six months.

Education 
The village has a Punjabi medium, co-educational primary school. It provides mid day mealss under the Indian Midday Meal Scheme and the meal is prepared in school premises. In accordance with the Right of Children to Free and Compulsory Education Act, the school provides free education to children between the ages of 6 and 14.

Amardeep Singh Shergill Memorial college Mukandpur and Sikh National College Banga are the nearest colleges.

Transport 
The nearest train station is Banga railway station.

See also 
List of villages in India

References

External links 
 Tourism of Punjab 
 Census of Punjab
 Locality Based PINCode

Villages in Shaheed Bhagat Singh Nagar district